A contract of sale, sales contract, sales order, or contract for sale is a legal contract for the purchase of assets (goods or property) by a buyer (or purchaser) from a seller (or vendor) for an agreed upon value in money (or money equivalent).

An obvious ancient practice of exchange, in many common law jurisdictions, it is now governed by statutory law. See commercial law.

Contracts of sale involving goods are governed by Article 2 of the Uniform Commercial Code in most jurisdictions in the United States and Canada.  However in Quebec, such contracts are governed by the Civil Code of Quebec as a nominate contract in the book on the law of obligations. In some Muslim countries it is governed by sharia (Islamic law); however, many Muslim countries apply other law to contacts (e.g. the Egyptian Civil Code, based on the Napoleonic Code, which beyond its application in Egypt serves as the model for the civil codes of several other Arab states).

A contract of sale lays out the terms of a transaction of goods or services, identifying the goods sold, listing delivery instructions, inspection period, any warranties and details of payment.

See also
Contract for future sale

Denmark
Danish Sale of Goods Act
United Kingdom
Sale of Goods Act 1893
Sale of Goods Act 1979
Consumer Rights Act 2015
Bill of sale
Part exchange
Tendering
Implied condition

References

Contract law
Sales